Makana Beach is a beach in Oahu, Hawaii.

Beaches of Oahu